Heidi. (stylized as heidi.) is a Japanese visual kei rock band formed in Tokyo in February 2006. They gained popularity after performing at the memorial concert on the 10th anniversary of the death of the musician hide on May 4, 2008, to tens of thousands of people. Their third album was released in Europe by Gan-Shin records in 2009 and the following year Heidi. signed to major label Geneon Universal Entertainment.

History
Heidi.'s first one-man show, titled 「Birth・Day」, was on June 3, 2006. Their first single, "Yuuyake to Kodomo/Maria", was also sold at that show. The following year they released their debut album, Kasou, on April 25, 2007. The label was their own O Market, which was formed by their management Headwax Organization, who also managed hide, being run by his brother Hiroshi Matsumoto.

On May 4, 2008, they performed at the hide memorial summit alongside legendary bands such as X Japan, Luna Sea and others. On September 21, 2008, D'erlanger held Abstinence's Door #002, where Heidi., Inoran and Merry performed.

In 2009, Heidi. went on a three-man tour called Counter Culture with lynch. and Sadie. They released their third album, Panorama, on September 23. It received a European release by Gan-Shin records on October 23. On October 25, the band performed at V-Rock Festival '09, which was broadcast live worldwide on its official website.

On May 26, 2010, they released their major label debut on Geneon Universal Entertainment, the single "Yokan". This song and their next single, "∞Loop", were both used as ending theme songs to the Kaichou wa Maid-sama! anime. Senkou Mellow was released on October 6, and is currently their highest-charting album.

They covered hide with Spread Beaver's "Pink Spider" for the compilation Crush! -90's V-Rock Best Hit Cover Songs-, the album was released on January 26, 2011, and features current visual kei bands covering songs from bands that were important to the '90s visual kei movement. Heidi.'s single "Gekkou Showtime" was used as the theme song for the movie Maebashi Visual Kei, which stars Shunsuke Kazama as a young farmer who tries to make it big in a visual kei band. The band members themselves also make an appearance in the film. In July 2011, Heidi. made their United States debut at the anime convention AM².

They released their fifth album, Alpha, on September 19, 2012. Later in the month, they returned to the US for a performance at Anime Weekend Atlanta. On November 7, Heidi. began a nationwide tour, that ended at Shibuya-AX, where each concert was broadcast live on NicoNico.

On August 16, 2013, heidi. performed at an event put on by the band Angelo, alongside other acts such as Inoran, lynch. and Mucc. They contributed a cover of hide's "Tell Me" to the Tribute II -Visual Spirits- tribute album, which was released on July 3, 2013.

Throughout April 2014, the band went on their first European tour which included stops in Russia, Poland, Germany and Finland among others. From November 7–9 they performed at the Pacific Media Expo in Los Angeles.

Members
  – vocals
  – guitar, backing vocals
  – bass, backing vocals 
  Koishikawa – drums

Discography
Studio albums
 , Oricon Albums Chart Peak Position: No. 132
  No. 55
  No. 80
  No. 41
  No. 138
  No. 62
  No. 122
  No. 125
  No. 218

Singles
 
 , Oricon Singles Chart Peak Position: No. 178, Oricon Indies Chart: No. 11
  No. 67 Oricon Indies Chart: No. 2
  No. 44
  No. 41
  No. 38
  No. 32 – first ending theme of the Kaichou wa Maid-sama! anime
  No. 48 – second ending theme of the Kaichou wa Maid-sama! anime
  No. 51 – theme song of the film Maebashi Visual Kei
  No. 101
  – limited concert-only single
  No. 194
  No. 143
  No. 111
 "Ray" (January 24, 2018) No. 88
 "Halation" (June 3, 2019)

Mini albums
 
  No. 84

Live albums
 Live Tour 2009 [Panorama] @ Shibuya C.C. Lemon Hall (March 10, 2010, CD & DVD)

Compilation albums
  No. 63
  No. 149

Various artists compilations
 Shock Wave CD (sixth edition)
 Shock Edge 2006 (October 10, 2006)
 Cannon Ball Vol.3 (February 21, 2007)
 Crush! -90's V-Rock Best Hit Cover Songs- (January 26, 2011)
 V-Anime Rocks (August 1, 2012)
 Tribute II -Visual Spirits- (July 3, 2013)

References

External links
 
 Official blog

Gan-Shin artists
Visual kei musical groups
Japanese alternative rock groups
Musical groups from Tokyo
Musical groups established in 2006
Musical quartets